The 1960 United States presidential election in Alabama was held on November 8, 1960 as part of that year's national presidential election. Eleven Democratic electors were elected, of whom six voted for Senator Harry F. Byrd of Virginia and five for Senator John F. Kennedy of Massachusetts.

In Alabama, voters voted for electors individually instead of as a slate, as in the other states. Twenty-two electors were on the ballot, 11 Republicans and 11 Democrats. Voters could vote for up to eleven candidates. As a result of a state primary, the Democratic Party had a mixed slate of electors, five being pledged to Kennedy and the remaining six being unpledged. The highest vote for a presidential elector was 324,050 votes for Frank M. Dixon, who was unpledged; the highest vote for an elector pledged to Kennedy was 318,303 for C. G. Allen, and the highest vote for a Republican elector was 237,981 for Cecil Durham, which was fewer than the vote for any Democratic elector. As a result, six unpledged electors and five electors pledged to Kennedy were elected. All six elected unpledged electors cast their vote for Byrd.

Varying methods have been used to break down the vote into Kennedy and unpledged votes. One method is to take the 318,303 votes as Kennedy votes and the 324,050 votes as unpledged votes, giving a total much higher than the actual votes cast. Another is to take the 318,303 votes as Kennedy votes and the remainder (5,747 votes) as unpledged votes. In all cases, Republican candidate Richard Nixon of California, then Vice President of the United States, has 237,981 votes. If the last method is used, it means that Nixon won the popular vote in Alabama; it also means that he won the popular vote nationally. Congressional Quarterly calculated the popular vote in this manner at the time of the 1960 election. This remains the last election in which Lee County, Shelby County, Baldwin County, and Mobile County voted for a Democratic presidential candidate.

Results

Results by county

See also
 United States presidential elections in Alabama
 United States presidential elections in which the winner lost the popular vote

Notes

References

1960
Alabama
1960 Alabama elections